The Annenberg Institute for School Reform at Brown University is an education research and reform institute at Brown University. Its mission is to "understand the causes and consequences of educational inequality and to reduce this inequality through innovative, multidimensional, and research-informed approaches." The institute was established in October 1993 as the National Institute for School Reform and renamed the Annenberg Institute for School Reform in December 1993 following a gift from the Annenberg Foundation.

Prominent educational reformer Theodore R. Sizer worked to found the institute and served as its inaugural director. Since 2018 the institute has been directed by Susanna Loeb.

History 
The National Institute for School Reform was established in October 1993 following a $5 million gift from an anonymous donor. In December 1993, the institute was endowed with a $50 million gift from the Annenberg Foundation and renamed the Annenberg Institute for School Reform. Theodore R. Sizer directed the institute from its founding in 1993 to 1996. In 1998 he was succeeded by Warren Simmons, who led the institute until 2015.

In 2016 and 2017 the university conducted a review of the institute. Following the review, the university moved to shift the institute's focus away from school reform and community-based work to focus primarily on research on educational inequality. In adjusting the institute's focus, provost Richard M. Locke sought to better integrate the institute's work with university research and academic departments. In 2018, Susanna Loeb of the Stanford Graduate School of Education joined the Annenberg Institute as its third executive director.

Work 
The Critical Friends Group model of professional learning originated at the Annenberg Institute in 1994.

People 

 Howard Fuller, Senior Fellow (1995–97)
 Susanna Loeb, Executive Director (2018–)
 Deborah Meier, Senior Fellow (1995-1997)
 Theodore R. Sizer, Executive Director (1993–1996)

References 

Brown University
1993 establishments in Rhode Island
Annenberg family
Education research institutes
Research institutes in Rhode Island